Agasi Babayan (21 December 1921 in Azatavan, Armenian SSR, USSR – November 17, 1995) was an Armenian director, screenwriter, and actor. He received the title of Merited Artist of the RSFSR in 1974.

Biography 
He studied acting and film direction under Sergei Gerasimov at VGIK and worked at the Armenfilm for several years. In 1952 he moved to work at the Mosnauchfilm studio (a Moscow studio that produced educational movies and TV shows). He is best known for making the original 1961 film version of Dersu Uzala (later more famously remade by Akira Kurosawa), as well as a series of four movies about the lynx Kunak based on the stories by Vitaly Bianki, shot in the taiga: The Path Towards Uninterested Love (1971), The Lynx Follows the Path (1982), The Lynx Returns (1986) and The Lynx Follows the Trail (1994). He also produced a number of documentaries on nature, history and music.

References

1921 births
1995 deaths
Soviet film directors
Armenian film directors
Armenian screenwriters
Armenian male film actors
Soviet Armenians
Russian film directors
Gerasimov Institute of Cinematography alumni
20th-century screenwriters